The 46 members of the Parliament of Vanuatu from 1987 to 1991 were elected on 30 November 1987.

List of members

References

 1987